Zobellia is a strictly aerobic genus from the family of Flavobacteriaceae. Zobellia bacteria occur in marine habitats.

References

Further reading
 
 

Flavobacteria
Bacteria genera